The Volovăț is a right tributary of the river Sucevița in Romania. It flows into the Sucevița near Rădăuți.

References

Rivers of Romania
Rivers of Suceava County